Severne is a surname. Notable people with the surname include:

John Severne (1925–2015), British Royal Air Force officer and air racer
John Edmund Severne (1826–1899), English politician
Mary Ann Severne, New Zealand-born Australian actress